The Bellamy Trial is a 1929 American drama film directed by Monta Bell and written by Monta Bell and Joseph Farnham. The film stars Leatrice Joy, Betty Bronson, Edward J. Nugent, George Barraud, and Margaret Livingston. The film was released on January 23, 1929, by Metro-Goldwyn-Mayer.

Cast 
Leatrice Joy as Sue Ives
Betty Bronson as Reporter
Edward J. Nugent as Reporter
George Barraud as Pat Ives
Margaret Livingston as Mimi Bellamy
Kenneth Thomson as Stephen Bellamy
Margaret Seddon as Mother Ives
Charles Middleton as District Attorney
Charles Hill Mailes as Defense Attorney
William H. Tooker as Judge Carver
Cosmo Kyrle Bellew 
Robert Dudley as Coroner
Jacqueline Gadsdon (credited as Jacqueline Gadsden)
Dan Mason
Jack Raymond
Polly Ann Young

Preservation status
This film is incomplete with only reels 7 and 8 surviving.

References

External links 

1929 films
1920s English-language films
American drama films
1929 drama films
Metro-Goldwyn-Mayer films
Films directed by Monta Bell
American black-and-white films
1920s American films